Bhava may be:
 Bhava is a name of the Hindu god Shiva
 Bhava a mood, emotion or devotional state of mind
 Bhava, a philosophical concept in Buddhism
 Bhava samadhi, which is the channeling of emotional energies into single-pointed devotion
 Bhava (mood), a mental state mentioned in the Natya Shastra
 Bhava (king), a king mentioned in the Vedas
 Bhava in Yoga refers to any of a series of ascending religious moods
 Bhāva, in jyotisha is a house; one of the 12 divisions of the sky relative to the visible horizon
 Bhavabhuti, ancient Indian writer